Bass Pro is a shopping complex adjacent to the Champlain Place shopping mall in the city of Dieppe, New Brunswick, Canada near Moncton.

History

The Complex was opened on February 15, 1990 under the name Crystal Palace by Cadillac Fairview as mainly an indoor amusement park with McGinnis Landing and a hotel.
On July 31, 2014 Cadillac Fairview announced that Crystal Palace would permanently close on September 1, 2014 to make way for New Brunswick's first Bass Pro Shops store.
As of September 1, 2014, the indoor amusement park, which included 14 rides (Carousel, Sky Flyer, Pirate's Cove Mini Golf, Wave Swinger, Convoy, Jumping' Star, Tree House, Crazy Submarine, Climbing wall, Rio Grande, Red Baron, Crazy Kars, Bullet, and Lazer Runner), a video game arcade, and smaller snack locations including Pretzelmaker and Wazzoos (Canteen) closed for good to make way for Bass Pro Shop.
As of October 31, 2014, The Ramada hotel, McGinnis Landing Restaurant, and Convention Centre all have closed.
Crystal Palace has since been taken over and made into a Bass Pro Shops location.

See also 
Champlain Place
Dieppe, New Brunswick

External links

References 

Buildings and structures in Dieppe, New Brunswick
1990 establishments in New Brunswick
Tourist attractions in Dieppe, New Brunswick
Shopping malls in New Brunswick
Defunct amusement parks in Canada
Amusement parks opened in 1990